Josef (Yousef) Waleed Meri ( Yūsuf Walīd Marʿī) is an American historian of Interfaith Relations in the Middle East in the College of Islamic Studies, Hamad Bin Khalifa University, Doha, Qatar. He is presently an Associate of the Prince Alwaleed Bin Talal Center for Muslim-Christian Understanding at Georgetown University. Meri is also a Senior Associate of the Center for the Study of Jewish-Christian-Muslim Relations, Merrimack College.

From 2013 to 2014 Meri served as eighth Allianz Visiting professor of Islamic Studies at the Ludwig Maximilian University of Munich. He was also a Fellow of St. Edmund's College, Cambridge, Cambridge University, and a visiting fellow at the Centre of Islamic Studies, Cambridge University.

Meri is the winner of the 2014 Goldziher Prize in Jewish-Muslim Relations awarded by the Center for the Study of Jewish-Christian-Muslim Relations, Merrimack College.

Bibliography

Books and edited volumes 

(ed. and contributor) Medieval Islamic Civilization: An Encyclopedia, 2 vols. (Abingdon, Oxon. and New York: Routledge, 2017
(ed.) Jewish-Muslim Relations in Past and Present: A Kaleidoscopic View (Leiden: Brill, 2017)()
(ed. and contributor) The Routledge Handbook of Muslim-Jewish Relations (New York: Routledge, 2016)().
The Cult of Saints among Muslims and Jews in Medieval Syria (Oxford: Oxford University Press, 2002).
(ed. with Farhad Daftary) Culture and Memory in Medieval Islam (London and New York: I.B. Tauris, 2003).
(ed. and trans.) A Lonely Wayfarer's Guide to Pilgrimage: Ali ibn Abi Bakr's Kitab al-Isharat ila Ma'rifat al-Ziyarat (Princeton: Darwin Press, 2004). 
(ed. and contributor) Medieval Islamic Civilization: An Encyclopedia, 2 vols. (New York: Routledge, 2006).
(ed.)  Bayān al-Farq bayn al-Ṣadr wal-Qalb wal-Fuʾād wal-Lubb (بيان الفرق بين الصدر والقلب والفؤاد واللب], Second revised edition (Amman: The Royal Islamic Strategic Studies Centre, 2012. First published 2009).

References

External links
 - College of Islamic Studies, Hamad Bin Khalifa University

Academic staff of Hamad Bin Khalifa University
American medievalists
Scholars of medieval Islamic history
Social historians
1969 births
Living people
University of California, Berkeley alumni
Alumni of the University of Oxford
Alumni of Wolfson College, Oxford
American Islamic studies scholars
Binghamton University alumni
Fellows of St Edmund's College, Cambridge
American expatriate academics
Fulbright alumni